This page lists all described species of the spider family Cybaeidae accepted by the World Spider Catalog :

A

Allocybaeina

Allocybaeina Bennett, 2020
 A. littlewalteri Bennett, 2020 (type) — USA

B

Blabomma

Blabomma Chamberlin & Ivie, 1937
 B. californicum (Simon, 1895) (type) — USA
 B. flavipes Chamberlin & Ivie, 1937 — USA
 B. foxi Chamberlin & Ivie, 1937 — USA
 B. guttatum Chamberlin & Ivie, 1937 — USA
 B. hexops Chamberlin & Ivie, 1937 — USA
 B. lahondae (Chamberlin & Ivie, 1937) — USA
 B. oregonense Chamberlin & Ivie, 1937 — USA
 B. sanctum Chamberlin & Ivie, 1937 — USA
 B. sylvicola (Chamberlin & Ivie, 1937) — USA
 B. uenoi Paik & Yaginuma, 1969 — Korea
 B. yosemitense Chamberlin & Ivie, 1937 — USA

C

Calymmaria

Calymmaria Chamberlin & Ivie, 1937
 C. alleni Heiss & Draney, 2004 — USA
 C. aspenola Chamberlin & Ivie, 1942 — USA
 C. bifurcata Heiss & Draney, 2004 — USA
 C. californica (Banks, 1896) — USA
 C. carmel Heiss & Draney, 2004 — USA
 C. emertoni (Simon, 1897) — USA, Canada
 C. farallon Heiss & Draney, 2004 — USA
 C. gertschi Heiss & Draney, 2004 — USA
 C. humboldi Heiss & Draney, 2004 — USA
 C. iviei Heiss & Draney, 2004 — USA
 C. lora Chamberlin & Ivie, 1942 — USA
 C. minuta Heiss & Draney, 2004 — USA
 C. monicae Chamberlin & Ivie, 1937 (type) — USA
 C. monterey Heiss & Draney, 2004 — USA
 C. nana (Simon, 1897) — USA, Canada
 C. orick Heiss & Draney, 2004 — USA
 C. persica (Hentz, 1847) — USA
 C. rosario Heiss & Draney, 2004 — Mexico
 C. rothi Heiss & Draney, 2004 — USA
 C. scotia Heiss & Draney, 2004 — USA
 C. sequoia Heiss & Draney, 2004 — USA
 C. shastae Chamberlin & Ivie, 1937 — USA
 C. sierra Heiss & Draney, 2004 — USA
 C. similaria Heiss & Draney, 2004 — USA
 C. siskiyou Heiss & Draney, 2004 — USA
 C. sueni Heiss & Draney, 2004 — USA
 C. suprema Chamberlin & Ivie, 1937 — USA, Canada
 C. tecate Heiss & Draney, 2004 — Mexico
 C. tubera Heiss & Draney, 2004 — USA
 C. virginica Heiss & Draney, 2004 — USA
 C. yolandae Heiss & Draney, 2004 — USA

Cedicoides

Cedicoides Charitonov, 1946
 C. maerens (Simon, 1889) — Turkmenistan
 C. parthus (Fet, 1993) — Turkmenistan
 C. pavlovskyi (Spassky, 1941) — Tajikistan
 C. simoni (Charitonov, 1946) (type) — Uzbekistan

Cedicus

Cedicus Simon, 1875
 C. bucculentus Simon, 1889 — Himalayas
 C. dubius Strand, 1907 — Japan
 C. flavipes Simon, 1875 (type) — Eastern Mediterranean
 C. israeliensis Levy, 1996 — Turkey, Israel
 C. pumilus Thorell, 1895 — Myanmar

Cryphoeca

Cryphoeca Thorell, 1870
 C. angularis Saito, 1934 — Japan
 C. brignolii Thaler, 1980 — Switzerland, Italy
 C. carpathica Herman, 1879 — Eastern Europe
 C. exlineae Roth, 1988 — USA
 C. lichenum L. Koch, 1876 — Germany, Austria
 C. l. nigerrima Thaler, 1978 — Germany, Austria
 C. montana Emerton, 1909 — USA, Canada
 C. nivalis Schenkel, 1919 — Switzerland, Austria, Italy
 C. pirini (Drensky, 1921) — Bulgaria
 C. shingoi Ono, 2007 — Japan
 C. shinkaii Ono, 2007 — Japan
 C. silvicola (C. L. Koch, 1834) (type) — Europe, Turkey, Russia (Europe to Far East), Japan
 C. thaleri Wunderlich, 1995 — Turkey

Cryphoecina

Cryphoecina Deltshev, 1997
 C. deelemanae Deltshev, 1997 (type) — Montenegro

Cybaeina

Cybaeina Chamberlin & Ivie, 1932
 C. confusa Chamberlin & Ivie, 1942 — USA
 C. minuta (Banks, 1906) (type) — USA
 C. sequoia Roth, 1952 — USA
 C. xantha Chamberlin & Ivie, 1937 — USA

Cybaeota

Cybaeota Chamberlin & Ivie, 1933
 C. calcarata (Emerton, 1911) (type) — USA, Canada
 C. munda Chamberlin & Ivie, 1937 — USA
 C. nana Chamberlin & Ivie, 1937 — USA, Canada
 C. shastae Chamberlin & Ivie, 1937 — USA
 C. wesolowskae Marusik, Omelko & Koponen, 2020 — Russia (Far East)

Cybaeozyga

Cybaeozyga Chamberlin & Ivie, 1937
 C. heterops Chamberlin & Ivie, 1937 (type) — USA

Cybaeus

Cybaeus L. Koch, 1868
 C. abchasicus Charitonov, 1947 — Turkey, Caucasus (Russia, Georgia)
 C. adenes Chamberlin & Ivie, 1932 — USA
 C. aikana Ihara, Koike & Nakano, 2021 — Japan (Ryukyu Is.)
 C. aizuensis Kobayashi, 2006 — Japan
 C. akaanaensis (Komatsu, 1968) — Japan
 C. akiensis Ihara, 2003 — Japan
 C. amamiensis Ihara, Koike & Nakano, 2021 — Japan (Ryukyu Is.)
 C. amicus Chamberlin & Ivie, 1932 — USA
 C. anaiwaensis (Komatsu, 1968) — Japan
 C. angustiarum L. Koch, 1868 — Europe, Azerbaijan?, Iran?
 C. aokii Yaginuma, 1972 — Japan
 C. aquilonalis Yaginuma, 1958 — China, Japan
 C. aratrum Kim & Kim, 2008 — Korea
 C. asahi Kobayashi, 2006 — Japan
 C. ashikitaensis (Komatsu, 1968) — Japan
 C. aspenicolens Chamberlin & Ivie, 1932 — USA
 C. auburn Bennett, 2019 — USA
 C. auriculatus Seo, 2017 — Korea
 C. balkanus Deltshev, 1997 — Bulgaria, Serbia, North Macedonia
 C. bam Marusik & Logunov, 1991 — Russia (Kurile Is.)
 C. basarukini Marusik & Logunov, 1991 — Russia (Sakhalin)
 C. bitchuensis Ihara & Nojima, 2005 — Japan
 C. biwaensis Kobayashi, 2006 — Japan
 C. blasbes Chamberlin & Ivie, 1932 — USA
 C. brignolii Maurer, 1992 — Turkey
 C. broni Caporiacco, 1934 — Karakorum
 C. bulbosus Exline, 1935 — USA
 C. cascadius Roth, 1952 — USA
 C. charlesi Bennett, 2016 — USA, Canada
 C. chauliodous Bennett, 2009 — USA
 C. communis Yaginuma, 1972 — Japan
 C. confrantis Oliger, 1994 — Russia (Far East)
 C. conservans Chamberlin & Ivie, 1932 — USA
 C. consocius Chamberlin & Ivie, 1932 — USA
 C. constrictus Chamberlin & Ivie, 1942 — USA
 C. coylei Bennett, 2021 — USA
 C. cribelloides Chamberlin & Ivie, 1932 — USA
 C. cylisteus Zhu & Wang, 1992 — China
 C. daimonji Matsuda, Ihara & Nakano, 2020 — Japan
 C. daisen Ihara & Nojima, 2005 — Japan
 C. deletroneus Zhu & Wang, 1992 — China
 C. desmaeus Zhu & Wang, 1992 — China
 C. devius Chamberlin & Ivie, 1942 — USA
 C. echigo Kobayashi, 2006 — Japan
 C. echinaceus Zhu & Wang, 1992 — China
 C. enshu Kobayashi, 2006 — Japan
 C. eutypus Chamberlin & Ivie, 1932 — USA, Canada
 C. fraxineus Bennett, 2021 — USA
 C. fujisanus Yaginuma, 1972 — Japan
 C. fuujinensis (Komatsu, 1968) — Japan
 C. gassan Kobayashi, 2006 — Japan
 C. geumensis Seo, 2016 — Korea
 C. gidneyi Bennett, 2009 — USA
 C. giganteus Banks, 1892 — USA
 C. gonokawa Ihara, 1993 — Japan
 C. gotoensis (Yamaguchi & Yaginuma, 1971) — Japan
 C. grizzlyi Schenkel, 1950 — USA
 C. harrietae Bennett, 2016 — USA
 C. hatsushibai Ihara, 2005 — Japan
 C. hesper Chamberlin & Ivie, 1932 — USA
 C. hibaensis Ihara, 1994 — Japan
 C. higoensis Irie & Ono, 2000 — Japan
 C. hikidai Ihara, Koike & Nakano, 2021 — Japan (Ryukyu Is.)
 C. hiroshimaensis Ihara, 1993 — Japan
 C. ilweolensis Seo, 2016 — Korea
 C. inagakii Ono, 2008 — Japan
 C. intermedius Maurer, 1992 — France, Switzerland, Italy
 C. ishikawai (Kishida, 1940) — Japan
 C. itsukiensis Irie, 1998 — Japan
 C. jaanaensis Komatsu, 1968 — Japan
 C. jilinensis Song, Kim & Zhu, 1993 — China
 C. jinsekiensis Ihara, 2006 — Japan
 C. jiriensis Seo, 2016 — Korea
 C. jogyensis Seo, 2016 — Korea
 C. kawabensis Irie & Ono, 2002 — Japan
 C. kiiensis Kobayashi, 2006 — Japan
 C. kirigaminensis Komatsu, 1963 — Japan
 C. kiuchii Komatsu, 1965 — Japan
 C. kodama Ihara, Koike & Nakano, 2021 — Japan (Ryukyu Is.)
 C. kokuraensis Ihara, 2007 — Japan
 C. kompiraensis (Komatsu, 1968) — Japan
 C. kumadori Ihara, Koike & Nakano, 2021 — Japan (Ryukyu Is.)
 C. kumaensis Irie & Ono, 2001 — Japan
 C. kunashirensis Marusik & Logunov, 1991 — Russia (Sakhalin, Kurile Is.), Japan
 C. kunisakiensis Ihara, 2003 — Japan
 C. kuramotoi Yaginuma, 1963 — Japan
 C. longus Paik, 1966 — Korea
 C. maculosus Yaginuma, 1972 — Japan
 C. magnus Yaginuma, 1958 — Japan
 C. melanoparvus Kobayashi, 2006 — Japan
 C. mellotteei (Simon, 1886) — Japan
 C. mimasaka Ihara & Nojima, 2005 — Japan
 C. minoensis Kobayashi, 2006 — Japan
 C. minor Chyzer, 1897 — Europe
 C. miyagiensis Ihara, 2004 — Japan
 C. miyosii Yaginuma, 1941 — Japan
 C. momotaro Ihara & Nojima, 2005 — Japan
 C. montanus Maurer, 1992 — Switzerland, Italy
 C. monticola Kobayashi, 2006 — Japan
 C. morosus Simon, 1886 — USA, Canada
 C. mosanensis Paik & Namkung, 1967 — Korea
 C. multnoma Chamberlin & Ivie, 1942 — USA
 C. nagaiae Ihara, 2010 — Japan
 C. nagusa Ihara, 2010 — Japan
 C. nichikoensis (Komatsu, 1968) — Japan
 C. nipponicus (Uyemura, 1938) — Japan
 C. nishikawai (Komatsu, 1968) — Japan
 C. nojimai Ihara, 1993 — Japan
 C. obedientiarius Komatsu, 1963 — Japan
 C. odaensis Seo, 2016 — Korea
 C. okafujii Yaginuma, 1963 — Japan
 C. okayamaensis Ihara, 1993 — Japan
 C. okumae Ihara, 2010 — Japan
 C. okumurai Ihara, Koike & Nakano, 2021 — Japan (Ryukyu Is.)
 C. paralypropriapus Bennett, 2009 — USA
 C. parvus Seo, 2017 — Korea
 C. patritus Bishop & Crosby, 1926 — USA
 C. pearcei Bennett, 2019 — USA
 C. penedentatus Bennett, 2009 — USA
 C. perditus Chamberlin & Ivie, 1932 — USA
 C. petegarinus Yaginuma, 1972 — Japan
 C. rarispinosus Yaginuma, 1970 — Japan
 C. raymondi (Simon, 1916) — Pyrenees (Spain, France)
 C. reducens Chamberlin & Ivie, 1932 — USA
 C. reticulatus Simon, 1886 — USA, Canada
 C. rothi Bennett, 2016 — USA
 C. ryunoiwayaensis Komatsu, 1968 — Japan
 C. ryusenensis (Komatsu, 1968) — Japan
 C. sanbruno Bennett, 2009 — USA
 C. sanctus (Komatsu, 1942) — Japan
 C. sasakii Ihara, 2004 — Japan
 C. sasayamaensis Ihara, 2010 — Japan
 C. schusteri Bennett, 2019 — USA
 C. scopulatus Chamberlin & Ivie, 1942 — USA
 C. senzokuensis (Komatsu, 1968) — Japan
 C. seorakensis Seo, 2016 — Korea
 C. septatus Chamberlin & Ivie, 1942 — USA
 C. shingenni Komatsu, 1968 — Japan
 C. shinkaii (Komatsu, 1970) — Japan
 C. shoshoneus Chamberlin & Ivie, 1932 — USA
 C. signatus Keyserling, 1881 — Peru
 C. signifer Simon, 1886 — USA, Canada
 C. silicis Barrows, 1919 — USA
 C. simplex Roth, 1952 — USA
 C. sinuosus Fox, 1937 — Canada
 C. solanum Bennett, 2016 — USA
 C. somesbar Bennett, 2009 — USA
 C. songniensis Seo, 2016 — Korea
 C. strandi Kolosváry, 1934 — Romania
 C. striatipes Bösenberg & Strand, 1906 — Russia (Sakhalin, Kurile Is.), Japan
 C. tajimaensis Ihara & Nojima, 2005 — Japan
 C. takachihoensis Irie & Ono, 2010 — Japan
 C. takasawaensis (Komatsu, 1970) — Japan
 C. taraensis Irie & Ono, 2001 — Japan
 C. tardatus (Chamberlin, 1919) — USA
 C. tetricus (C. L. Koch, 1839) (type) — Europe
 C. thermydrinos Bennett, 2009 — USA
 C. tokunoshimensis Ihara, Koike & Nakano, 2021 — Japan (Ryukyu Is.)
 C. torosus Bennett, 2019 — USA
 C. tottoriensis Ihara, 1994 — Japan
 C. triangulus Paik, 1966 — Korea
 C. tsurugi Ihara, 2003 — Japan
 C. tsurusakii Ihara, 1993 — Japan
 C. uenoi (Yaginuma, 1970) — Japan
 C. urabandai Ihara, 2004 — Japan
 C. vignai Brignoli, 1977 — France, Italy
 C. vulpinus Bennett, 2009 — USA
 C. waynei Bennett, 2009 — USA
 C. whanseunensis Paik & Namkung, 1967 — Korea
 C. yakushimensis Ihara, Koike & Nakano, 2021 — Japan (Ryukyu Is.)
 C. yoshiakii Yaginuma, 1968 — Japan
 C. yoshidai Ihara, 2004 — Japan
 C. yufuin Ihara, 2007 — Japan
 C. zenifukiensis (Komatsu, 1968) — Japan

D

Dirksia

Dirksia Chamberlin & Ivie, 1942
 D. cinctipes (Banks, 1896) (type) — USA
 D. pyrenaea (Simon, 1898) — France

E

Ethobuella

Ethobuella Chamberlin & Ivie, 1937
 E. hespera Chamberlin & Ivie, 1937 — USA
 E. tuonops Chamberlin & Ivie, 1937 (type) — USA, Canada

L

† Lutetiana

† Lutetiana Selden and Wappler, 2019
 † L. neli Selden and Wappler, 2019 (type) — Eocene Lutetian Messel lacustrine sediments, Germany

N

Neocryphoeca

Neocryphoeca Roth, 1970
 N. beattyi Roth, 1970 — USA
 N. gertschi Roth, 1970 (type) — USA

P

Paracedicus

Paracedicus Fet, 1993
 P. baram Levy, 2007 — Israel
 P. darvishi Mirshamsi, 2018 — Iran
 P. ephthalitus (Fet, 1993) (type) — Turkmenistan
 P. feti Marusik & Guseinov, 2003 — Azerbaijan
 P. gennadii (Fet, 1993) — Iran, Turkmenistan
 P. geshur Levy, 2007 — Israel
 P. kasatkini Zamani & Marusik, 2017 — Iran

S

Symposia

Symposia Simon, 1898
 S. bifurca Roth, 1967 — Venezuela
 S. columbiana Müller & Heimer, 1988 — Colombia
 S. dubiosa Roth, 1967 — Venezuela
 S. sexoculata Roth, 1967 — Venezuela
 S. silvicola Simon, 1898 (type) — Venezuela
 S. umbrosa Simon, 1898 — Venezuela

T

Tuberta

Tuberta Simon, 1884
 T. maerens (O. Pickard-Cambridge, 1863) (type) — Britain, France, Switzerland, Belgium, Germany, Croatia, Bulgaria, Turkey, Azerbaijan
 T. mirabilis (Thorell, 1871) — Italy

V

Vagellia

Vagellia Simon, 1899
 V. helveola Simon, 1899 (type) — Indonesia (Sumatra)

W

Willisus

Willisus Roth, 1981
 W. gertschi Roth, 1981 (type) — USA

Y

Yorima

Yorima Chamberlin & Ivie, 1942
 Y. albida Roth, 1956 — USA
 Y. angelica Roth, 1956 — USA
 Y. antillana (Bryant, 1940) — Cuba
 Y. flava (Chamberlin & Ivie, 1937) — USA
 Y. sequoiae (Chamberlin & Ivie, 1937) (type) — USA
 Y. subflava Chamberlin & Ivie, 1942 — USA

References

Cybaeidae